Deštná may refer to the following places in the Czech Republic:

 Deštná (Blansko District), village in Blansko District
 Deštná (Jindřichův Hradec District), small town in Jindřichův Hradec District
 Velká Deštná, mountain